西海, meaning "west sea", may refer to: 

In the Chinese reading Xīhǎi:
Xihai Jun, a prefecture of ancient China
Qinghai Lake, one of the Four Seas of China

In the Korean reading Seohae, alternatively spelled Sŏhae:
Sohae University (서해대학교/西海大學校) in Gunsan, South Korea
Former name of Hwanghae, one of the Eight Provinces of Korea during the Joseon Dynasty
The Yellow Sea, sometimes also called the West Sea of Korea

In the Japanese readings Saikai or Nishiumi:
Saikaidō, a region of ancient Japan
Saikai, Nagasaki (西海市), city in Nagasaki Prefecture
Nishiumi, Ehime (西海町), former village in Ehime Prefecture